The Lamont Baronetcy, of Knockdaw in the Parish of Inverchaolain in the County of Argyll, was a title in the Baronetage of the United Kingdom. It was created on 16 July 1910 for the Scottish explorer and Liberal Member of Parliament, James Lamont. He was succeeded by his son, the second Baronet. He was also a Liberal politician. He never married and the title became extinct on his death in 1949.

Lamont baronets, of Knockdaw (1910)
Sir James Lamont, 1st Baronet (1828–1913)
Sir Norman Lamont, 2nd Baronet (1869–1949)

References

Extinct baronetcies in the Baronetage of the United Kingdom